The Holy Land is an area roughly located between the Mediterranean Sea and the Eastern Bank of the Jordan River, traditionally synonymous both with the biblical Land of Israel and with the region of Palestine. The term "Holy Land" usually refers to a territory roughly corresponding to the modern State of Israel and the Palestinian territories. Jews, Christians, and Muslims regard it as holy.

Part of the significance of the land stems from the religious significance of Jerusalem (the holiest city to Judaism, and the location of the First and Second Temples), as well as its historical significance as the setting for most of the Bible, the historical locale of Jesus' ministry, the location of the first Qibla and the site of the Isra and Mi'raj event in Islam.

The holiness of the land as a destination of Christian pilgrimage contributed to launching the Crusades, as European Christians sought to win back the Holy Land from Muslims, who had conquered it from the Christian Eastern Roman Empire in 630 AD. In the 19th century, the Holy Land became the subject of diplomatic wrangling as the holy places played a role in the Eastern Question which led to the Crimean War in the 1850s.

Many sites in the Holy Land have long been pilgrimage destinations for adherents of the Abrahamic religions, including Jews, Christians, Muslims, and Baháʼís. Pilgrims visit the Holy Land to touch and see physical manifestations of their faith, to confirm their beliefs in the holy context with collective excitation, and to connect personally to the Holy Land.

Judaism

Researchers consider that the concept of a land made holy by being the "earthly dwelling of the God of Israel" was present in Judaism at the latest by the time of Zechariah (6th century BCE). 

Jews commonly refer to the Land of Israel as "The Holy Land". However, the Tanakh explicitly refers to it as "holy land" in only one passage, . The term "holy land" is further used twice in the deuterocanonical books. The holiness of the Land of Israel is generally implied in the Tanakh by the Land being given to the Israelites by God, that is, it is the "promised land", an integral part of God's covenant.

In the Torah, many mitzvot commanded to the Israelites can only be performed in the Land of Israel, which serves to differentiate it from other lands. For example, in the Land of Israel, "no land shall be sold permanently". Shmita is only observed with respect to the Land of Israel, and the observance of many holy days is different, as an extra day is observed in the Jewish diaspora.

According to Eliezer Schweid:

From the perspective of the 1906 Jewish Encyclopedia, the holiness of Israel had been concentrated since the sixteenth century, especially for burial, in the "Four Holy Cities": Jerusalem, Hebron, Safed and Tiberias – as Judaism's holiest cities. Jerusalem, as the site of the Temple, is considered especially significant. Sacred burials are still undertaken for diaspora Jews who wish to lie buried in the holy soil of Israel.

According to Jewish tradition, Jerusalem is Mount Moriah, the location of the binding of Isaac. The Hebrew Bible mentions the name "Jerusalem" 669 times, often because many mitzvot can only be performed within its environs. The name "Zion", which usually refers to Jerusalem, but sometimes the Land of Israel, appears in the Hebrew Bible 154 times. 

The Talmud mentions the religious duty of populating Israel. So significant in Judaism is the act of purchasing land in Israel, the Talmud allows for the lifting of certain religious restrictions of Sabbath observance to further its acquisition and settlement. Rabbi Johanan said that "Whoever walks four cubits in Eretz Yisrael [the Land of Israel] is guaranteed entrance to the World to Come". A story says that when R. Eleazar b. Shammua' and R. Johanan HaSandlar left Israel to study from R. Judah ben Bathyra, they only managed to reach Sidon when "the thought of the sanctity of Palestine overcame their resolution, and they shed tears, rent their garments, and turned back". Due to the Jewish population being concentrated in Israel, emigration was generally prevented, which resulted in a limiting of the amount of space available for Jewish learning. However, after suffering persecutions in Israel for centuries after the destruction of the Temple, Rabbis who had found it very difficult to retain their position moved to Babylon, which offered them better protection. Many Jews wanted Israel to be the place where they died, in order to be buried there. The sage Rabbi Anan said "To be buried in Israel is like being buried under the altar." The saying "His land will absolve His people" implies that burial in Israel will cause one to be absolved of all one's sins.

Christianity

For Christians, the Land of Israel is considered holy because of its association with the birth, ministry, crucifixion and resurrection of Jesus, whom Christians regard as the Savior or Messiah.

Christian books, including many editions of the Bible, often have maps of the Holy Land (considered to be Galilee, Samaria, and Judea). For instance, the Itinerarium Sacrae Scripturae of Heinrich Bünting (1545–1606), a German Protestant pastor, featured such a map. His book was very popular, and it provided "the most complete available summary of biblical geography and described the geography of the Holy Land by tracing the travels of major figures from the Old and New testaments."

As a geographic term, the description "Holy Land" loosely encompasses modern-day Israel, the Palestinian territories, Lebanon, western Jordan and south-western Syria.

On 4 January 1964, Paul VI made the first visit of a reigning pontiff to the Holy Land. It was a one day visit to Jerusalem. On 20 April 1984, John Paul II fully recognized the Jewish nation and on 21 March 2000 he made the first five-days pilgrimage of a pope in Israel.

Catholic Church guidelines for Holy Land pilgrimages recommend that visitors should seek "a healthy balance between visiting the holy places and encountering the local Christian community".

Islam

In the Quran, the term  is used in a passage about Musa (Moses) proclaiming to the Children of Israel: "O my people! Enter the holy land which Allah hath assigned unto you, and turn not back ignominiously, for then will ye be overthrown, to your own ruin." The Quran also refers to the land as being 'Blessed'.

Jerusalem (referred to as Al-Quds, "The Holy") has particular significance in Islam. The Quran refers to Muhammad's experiencing the Isra and Mi'raj as "a Journey by night from Al-Masjid al-Haram to Al-Masjid al-Aqsa, whose precincts We did bless ...". Ahadith infer that the "Farthest Masjid" is in Al-Quds; for example, as narrated by Abu Hurairah: "On the night journey of the Apostle of Allah, two cups, one containing wine and the other containing milk, were presented to him at Al-Quds (Jerusalem). He looked at them and took the cup of milk. Angel Gabriel said, 'Praise be to Allah, who guided you to Al-Fitrah (the right path); if you had taken (the cup of) wine, your Ummah would have gone astray'." Jerusalem was Islam's first Qiblah (direction of prayer) in Muhammad's lifetime, however, this was later changed to the Kaaba in the Hijazi city of Mecca, following a revelation to Muhammad by the Archangel Jibril. The current construction of the Al-Aqsa mosque, which lies on the Temple Mount in Jerusalem, is dated to the early Umayyad period of rule in Palestine. Architectural historian K. A. C. Creswell, referring to a testimony by Arculf, a Gallic monk, during his pilgrimage to Palestine in 679–82, notes the possibility that the second caliph of the Rashidun Caliphate, Umar ibn al-Khattab, erected a primitive quadrangular building for a capacity of 3,000 worshipers somewhere on the Haram ash-Sharif. However, Arculf visited Palestine during the reign of Mu'awiyah I, and it is possible that Mu'awiyah ordered the construction, not Umar. This latter claim is explicitly supported by the early Muslim scholar al-Muthahhar bin Tahir. According to the Quran and Islamic traditions, Al-Aqsa Mosque is the place from which Muhammad went on a night journey (al-isra) during which he rode on Buraq, who took him from Mecca to al-Aqsa. Muhammad tethered Buraq to the Western Wall and prayed at al-Aqsa Mosque and after he finished his prayers, the angel Jibril (Gabriel) traveled with him to heaven, where he met several other prophets and led them in prayer. The historical significance of the al-Aqsa Mosque in Islam is further emphasized by the fact that Muslims turned towards al-Aqsa when they prayed for a period of 16 or 17 months after migration to Medina in 624; it thus became the qibla ("direction") that Muslims faced for prayer.

Abdullah Yusuf Ali likens it to a wide land-range including Syria and Lebanon, especially the cities of Tyre and Sidon; Az-Zujaj describes it as, "Damascus, Palestine, and a bit of Jordan"; Muadh ibn Jabal as, "the area between al-Arish and the Euphrates"; and Ibn Abbas as, "the land of Jericho". This overall region is referred to as "Ash-Shām".

Baháʼí faith
Followers of the Baháʼí Faith consider Acre and Haifa sacred as Bahá'u'lláh, the founder of the Baháʼí Faith, was exiled to the prison of Acre from 1868 and spent his life in its surroundings until his death in 1892. In his writings he set the slope of Mount Carmel to host the Shrine of the Báb which his appointed successor 'Abdu'l-Bahá erected in 1909 as a beginning of the terraced gardens there. The Head of the religion after him, Shoghi Effendi, began building other structures and the Universal House of Justice continued the work until the Baháʼí World Centre was brought to its current state as the spiritual and administrative centre of the religion. Its gardens are highly popular places to visit and Mohsen Makhmalbaf's 2012 film The Gardener featured them. The holiest places currently for Baháʼí pilgrimage are the Shrine of Bahá'u'lláh in Acre and the Shrine of the Báb in Haifa which are UNESCO World Heritage Sites.

See also
 Archaeological sites in Israel
 Crusader states
 History of Palestine
 History of the Jews and Judaism in the Land of Israel
 Holiest sites in Islam
 Holy places
 List of religious sites
 Laws and customs of the Land of Israel in Judaism

Notes

References

External links

 Manuscripts from the Holy Land Shapell Manuscript Foundation
 "Description of the Holy Land", 1585 map depicting the Holy Land at the time of Jesus, World Digital Library

Abrahamic religions
Christian holy places
Crusade places
Hebrew Bible places
Historical regions in Israel
Islamic holy places
Jewish holy places
Land of Israel
Places in the deuterocanonical books
Religion and geography
Religious places
Religious terminology
History of Israel